Heinrich Meldahl (8 September 1776 – 24 February 1840) was a Danish industrial designer, architect and the owner of an iron foundry.

Early life
Heinrich Joachim Meldahl was born in Copenhagen, Denmark. He was the son of Christen Larsen Meldahl (ca. 1742-1782) and Cathrine Wendorf (1742-1807).

Career
From 1804, Meldahl was employed as a designer and operating engineer by  Jacob Aall at the Næs jernverk  in Aust-Agder, Norway. It was his task to  lead   production and deliver drawings to new product models. From 1806-07, Meldahl returned to Copenhagen for further education in drawing.

In 1811, he returned to Denmark, where he was granted permission to establish  an iron foundry at Vesterbro. Production included  agricultural tools including plows and harrows as well as stoves and ovens similar to those from Næs.

Personal life
He was married to Benedicte Louise Hansen (1796- 1845) and was the father of  Danish architect  Ferdinand Meldahl (1827-1908).

References

External links

1776 births
1840 deaths
People from Copenhagen
Danish architects
Danish industrialists
19th-century Danish businesspeople
Businesspeople from Copenhagen